Richard Hastings (born 1977) is a Canadian soccer player.

Richard Hastings may also refer to:

Richard Hastings, Baron Welles (died 1503)
Sir Richard Hastings, 1st Baronet (died 1668), of the Hastings baronets
Doc Hastings (Richard Norman Hastings, born 1941), American politician

See also
Hastings (name)